The District of Luxembourg was one of three districts of the Grand Duchy of Luxembourg. It contained four cantons, divided into 44 communes:

Capellen
Dippach
Garnich
Habscht
Käerjeng
Kehlen
Koerich
Kopstal
Mamer
Steinfort
Esch-sur-Alzette
Bettembourg
Differdange
Dudelange
Esch-sur-Alzette
Frisange
Kayl
Leudelange
Mondercange
Pétange
Reckange-sur-Mess
Roeser
Rumelange
Sanem
Schifflange
Luxembourg
Bertrange
Contern
Hesperange
Luxembourg
Niederanven
Sandweiler
Schuttrange
Steinsel
Strassen
Walferdange
Weiler-la-Tour
Mersch
Bissen
Colmar-Berg
Fischbach
Heffingen
Helperknapp
Larochette
Lintgen
Lorentzweiler
Mersch
Nommern

It bordered the district of Grevenmacher to the east, the district of Diekirch to the north, the Belgian province of Luxembourg (Wallonia) to the west and the French Département of Moselle (Grand Est) to the south. It also had the highest per capita income of the districts of the duchy. Its per capita income was $72,300.

After the reorganization of Luxembourg's administrative divisions in 2015, all three districts were abolished per 3 October 2015.

External links

http://www.communes.lu/ - Features a map of the communes of Luxembourg
http://www.travelguide.lu/ Information system for country of Luxembourg

 
Districts of Luxembourg